is a city located in the western portion of Tokyo Metropolis, Japan. , the city had an estimated population of 148,275, and a population density of 8700 persons per km2.

Geography
Higashimurayama is located on the eastern edge of the Sayama Hills, almost in the center of the Musashino Terrace. Most of the city area is flat, except for the northwestern hills.

Surrounding municipalities
Tokyo Metropolis
Higashikurume
Kiyose
Higashiyamato
Kodaira
Saitama Prefecture
Tokorozawa

Climate
Higashimurayama has a Humid subtropical climate (Köppen Cfa) characterized by warm summers and cool winters with light to no snowfall.  The average annual temperature in Higashimurayama is 14.0 °C. The average annual rainfall is 1647 mm with September as the wettest month. The temperatures are highest on average in August, at around 25.7 °C, and lowest in January, at around 2.3 °C.

Demographics
Per Japanese census data, the population of Higashimurayama increased rapidly in the 1950s and 1960s.

History
The area of present-day Higashimurayama has been inhabited since Japanese Paleolithic times, and numerous remains from the Jōmon, Yayoi and Kofun periods have been discovered. During the Nara period, it became part of ancient Musashi Province. During the Kamakura period, it was the location of the Battle of Kumegawa in 1333.

In the post-Meiji Restoration cadastral reform of April 1, 1889, several villages merged to form Higashimurayama Village in Nishitama District, at that time part of Kanagawa Prefecture. The entire district was transferred to the control of Tokyo Prefecture on April 1, 1893. On April 1, 1942, Higashimurayama Village became the town of Higashimurayama. On April 1, 1964, Higashimurayama was elevated to city status.

Government
Higashimurayama has a mayor-council form of government with a directly elected mayor and a unicameral city council of 25 members. Higashimurayama, collectively with Higashiyamato and Musashimurayama, contributes three members to the Tokyo Metropolitan Assembly. In terms of national politics, the city is part of Tokyo 20th district of the lower house of the Diet of Japan.

Economy
Higashimurayama was formerly an agricultural area, and was noted for its production of sweet potatoes. It is now primary a regional commercial center, and a bedroom community for central Tokyo.

Transportation

Railway
 JR East – Musashino Line
  
 Seibu Railway  – Seibu Shinjuku Line
  - 
 Seibu Railway  – Seibu Haijima Line
 
Seibu Railway  – Seibu Kokubunji Line
 
Seibu Railway  – Seibu Tamako Line
  -  -  - 
Seibu Railway  – Seibu Ikebukuro Line
 
 Seibu Railway – Seibu Seibu-en Line
  – 
Seibu Railway  – Seibu Yamaguchi Line

Highways
Higashimurayama is not served by any national highways or expressways.

Education 
The city has two public high schools operated by the Tokyo Metropolitan Board of Education.
 
 

Higashimurayama has 15 public elementary schools and seven public junior high schools operated by the city government.

Public junior high schools:

 Higashimurayama No. 1 (東村山第一中学校)
 Higashimurayama No. 2 (東村山第二中学校)
 Higashimurayama No. 3 (東村山第三中学校)
 Higashimurayama No. 4 (東村山第四中学校)
 Higashimurayama No. 5 (東村山第五中学校)
 Higashimurayama No. 6 (東村山第六中学校)
 Higashimurayama No. 7 (東村山第七中学校)

Public elementary school:

 Akitsu (秋津小学校)
 Akitsu Higashi (秋津東小学校)
 Aoba (青葉小学校)
 Fujimi (富士見小学校)
 Hagiyama (萩山小学校)
 Higashi Hagiyama (東萩山小学校)
 Kasei (化成小学校)
 Kitayama (北山小学校)
 Kumegawa (久米川小学校)
 Kumegawa Higashi (久米川東小学校)
 Megurita (回田小学校)
 Minamidai (南台小学校)
 Nobidome (野火止小学校)
 Onta (大岱小学校)
 Yasaka (八坂小学校)

There are also three private combined junior/senior high schools.
 
 
  - Junior and senior high school

Local attractions
 The oldest intact building in Tokyo and one of only two buildings in Tokyo registered as a National Treasure of Japan; the Jizō hall in the temple of Shōfuku-ji.
 Hachikokuyama, a park that is an inspiration for My Neighbor Totoro.
 National Hansen's Disease Museum of Japan
 Site of the 14th century Battle of Kumegawa
 A segment of the ancient Kamakura Kaido highway

Sister cities
Higashimurayama is twinned with the following cities:

Notable people from Higashimurayama 
Seiichiro Shimizu, Politician
Ken Shimura, Comedian
Shoko Aida, Singer
Miki Nakatani, Actress
Shōji Satō, Professional Badminton Player
Karen Miyama, Actress

References

External links

Higashimurayama City Official Website 

 
Cities in Tokyo
Western Tokyo